Philip of Portugal is the name of three Spanish kings who ruled over Portugal under a different ordinal number. In Spain they were known as Felipe, and in Portugal as Filipe.

 Philip I of Portugal or Philip II of Spain
 Philip II of Portugal or Philip III of Spain
 Philip III of Portugal or Philip IV of Spain

It's also the name of a Crown Prince of Portugal, son of John III of Portugal:
 Philip, Prince of Portugal (1533–1539)